Rok Marguč (born 25 May 1986, in Celje) is a Slovenian snowboarder who competed at the 2010 Winter Olympics, finishing 23rd in the Parallel Giant Slalom event.

Marguc won two medals at the 2011 FIS Snowboarding World Championships: a silver in Parallel Giant Slalom, and a bronze in Parallel Slalom.

Two years later, at the 2013 FIS Snowboarding World Championships, he captured gold in the parallel slalom.

World Cup

Podiums

References

External links 
 FIS-Ski.com – Biography

1986 births
Living people
Slovenian male snowboarders
Snowboarders at the 2010 Winter Olympics
Snowboarders at the 2014 Winter Olympics
Snowboarders at the 2018 Winter Olympics
Snowboarders at the 2022 Winter Olympics
Olympic snowboarders of Slovenia
Sportspeople from Celje
Universiade medalists in snowboarding
Universiade gold medalists for Slovenia
Competitors at the 2007 Winter Universiade